Terry J. Hollinger (born  February 24, 1971 in Regina, Saskatchewan) is a Canadian retired professional ice hockey player who played seven games in the National Hockey League for the St. Louis Blues.

Career statistics

External links

1971 births
Living people
Canadian ice hockey defencemen
Houston Aeros (1994–2013) players
Iserlohn Roosters players
Lethbridge Hurricanes players
Manitoba Moose (IHL) players
HC Milano players
Orlando Solar Bears (IHL) players
Peoria Rivermen (IHL) players
Providence Bruins players
Quad City Mallards (UHL) players
Regina Pats players
Rochester Americans players
Sportspeople from Regina, Saskatchewan
St. Louis Blues draft picks
St. Louis Blues players
Utah Grizzlies (IHL) players
Worcester IceCats players
Canadian expatriate ice hockey players in the United States
Canadian expatriate ice hockey players in Italy
Canadian expatriate ice hockey players in Germany